The chinstrap beard is a type of facial hair that extends from the hair line of one side of the face to the other, following the jawline, much like the chin curtain; unlike the chin curtain though, it does not cover the entire chin, but only the very edges of the jaw and chin. It was fashionable from the late 18th century through the mid-19th century in Europe, and later in Russia and Japan. It was worn by Hudson Taylor, an English missionary to China, and also by Paul Kruger, the president of the 19th-century Transvaal Republic (in what is now South Africa). It is also worn today, but in an alternative version by athletes such as Dwyane Wade, Elvis Andrus, Raymond Felton, Obada Obaisi, Matt Hardy and David Ortiz among others.

Famous or notable chinstrap beards 
 Henry David Thoreau, famous Transcendental philosopher and author.
 David E. Twiggs, U.S. Army general who wore a chinstrap beard when facial hair in the military was becoming common.
 Camillo Benso, Count of Cavour, 19th century Italian Politician and leading figure of Risorgimento.
 Richard Wagner, German composer
 Lewis Hamilton, British Formula One racing driver.
 Gordon Hillman
 Stormzy, British rapper.
 Wayne Static

See also
 List of facial hairstyles

References 

Beard styles